The following is a list of films and other media in which Mickey Mouse has appeared.

1920s

1928
Plane Crazy – A silent version was only shown in certain places before it got released a few years later with sound.
The Gallopin' Gaucho – A silent version was only shown in certain places before it got released 10 months later with sound. First cartoon where Mickey and Minnie wear shoes.

Steamboat Willie – First Mickey cartoon with synchronized sound, including speech (the parrot says "Hope you don't feel hurt, big boy"). This was the first Mickey cartoon released but was made after Plane Crazy and The Gallopin' Gaucho. Walt Disney's first role as Mickey (although he speaks gibberish). First appearance of Mickey with his oval shaped eyes.

1929
The Barn Dance – First cartoon where Pete wears long gloves, but not short gloves. The picture book made off it in 1931 is the first appearance of Donald Duck, written in as a guest, and on the back cover in green suspenders and a pill-box hat. 
The Opry House – The first cartoon where Mickey wears gloves, although not at the beginning – he only puts them on to play the piano. First appearance of Percy Pigg and Kat Nipp.
When the Cat's Away – First cartoon where Mickey wears gloves right from the beginning. Loose remake of Alice Comedies cartoon Alice Rattled by Rats.
The Barnyard Battle – The first cartoon where Pete wears short gloves.
The Plow Boy – First appearance of Horace Horsecollar and the first cartoon where Minnie wears gloves.
The Karnival Kid – First cartoon in which Mickey speaks (he says "Hot dogs! Hot dogs!").
Mickey's Follies – First cartoon where Mickey sings "Minnie's Yoo-Hoo". First appearance of Patricia Pigg.
Mickey's Choo-Choo - Mickey owns a train, some ducks in a crate.
The Jazz Fool
Jungle Rhythm
The Haunted House
Wild Waves - Last Mickey short distributed by Celebrity Productions

1930s

1930
Fiddling Around (working title Just Mickey used in many references) – First Mickey short distributed by Columbia Pictures.
The Barnyard Concert
The Cactus Kid – First cartoon where Pete wears shoes.
The Fire Fighters 
The Shindig – First cartoon where Clarabelle is humanized and wears gloves and a dress.
The Chain Gang – First appearance of Pluto (prototypes).
The Gorilla Mystery
The Picnic – Pluto prototype appears as "Rover," Minnie's dog.
Pioneer Days 
Minnie's Yoo-Hoo special cartoon made for the original Mickey Mouse Club. Animation reused from Mickey's Follies.

1931
The Birthday Party 
Traffic Troubles
The Castaway 
The Moose Hunt – Pluto's first role under that name, and as Mickey's dog.
The Delivery Boy 
Mickey Steps Out 
Blue Rhythm 
Fishin' Around 
The Barnyard Broadcast 
The Beach Party
Mickey Cuts Up 
Mickey's Orphans – Reuses some story elements from Oswald the Lucky Rabbit cartoon Empty Socks

1932
The Duck Hunt 
The Grocery Boy
The Mad Dog 
Barnyard Olympics 
Mickey's Revue – First appearance of Goofy as Dippy Dawg, here shown with glasses and a beard. Reuses several scenes from The Opry House.
Musical Farmer
Mickey in Arabia – Last Mickey short distributed by Columbia Pictures
Mickey's Nightmare – First appearance of the Orphans (prototypes: here in an imaginary story as Mickey's future children), First Mickey short distributed by United Artists.
Trader Mickey 
The Whoopee Party – Redesign of Goofy to remove his glasses and beard.
Touchdown Mickey
The Wayward Canary 
The Klondike Kid – 
Parade of the Award Nominees – Mickey's first color appearance, not an official Mickey cartoon. His pants are green, not red as in the other color cartoons. The yellow gloves were used in a number of 1935 cartoons, excluding The Band Concert. This was Mickey's only color appearance in the early 1930s.
Mickey's Good Deed

1933
Building a Building – Remake of Oswald the Lucky Rabbit cartoon Sky Scrappers.
The Mad Doctor
Mickey's Pal Pluto – First appearance of Pluto's angel and the devil.
Mickey's Mellerdrammer
Ye Olden Days
The Mail Pilot
Mickey's Mechanical Man
Mickey's Gala Premier
Puppy Love – First appearance of Fifi the Peke.
The Pet Store
The Steeple Chase – Released in 16mm form under the title Mickey's Trick Horse And also released on super 8 film known as 'Micky In Horse Play'.
Giantland – Second appearance of the Orphans, now in their usual role as neighborhood kids.

1934
Shanghaied
Camping Out – known as "Camping Troubles" in releases outside the United States.
Playful Pluto 
Gulliver Mickey
Hollywood Party (guest appearance)
Mickey's Steam Roller – First appearance of Mickey's nephews Morty and Ferdie.
Orphan's Benefit – First time Donald Duck from The Wise Little Hen appears in a Mickey cartoon. First appearance of Clara Cluck. Last black and white appearance of Clarabelle Cow and Horace Horsecollar. First, cartoons were Mickey wears a shirt.
Mickey Plays Papa
The Dognapper 
Babes in Toyland (guest appearance in live-action; costumed character)
Two-Gun Mickey – Last black and white appearance of Minnie Mouse.

1935
Mickey's Man Friday 
The Band Concert – First official color Mickey Mouse cartoon. First color appearance of Goofy and Donald Duck.
Mickey's Service Station – First Mickey/Donald/Goofy trio cartoon. Last black and white appearance of Donald Duck, Goofy, and Pete.
Mickey's Kangaroo – Last Mickey cartoon in black and white. Last black and white appearance of Mickey and Pluto.
Mickey's Garden – First color appearance of Pluto. and Mickey's gloves were yellow again but this time light yellow color
Mickey's Fire Brigade
Pluto's Judgement Day 
On Ice – First color appearance of Minnie. Redesign of Goofy to his mature look: now with sleepy eyes, big chin, and trousers.

1936
Mickey's Polo Team
Orphans' Picnic
Mickey's Grand Opera - the last cartoon to show Donald with a very long bill.
Thru the Mirror 
Mickey's Rival – First appearance of Mortimer Mouse.
Moving Day – First color appearance of Pete.
Alpine Climbers
Mickey's Circus – First appearance of Salty the Seal.
Mickey's Elephant – First color appearance of Pluto's Devil.

1937
The Worm Turns 
Magician Mickey 
Moose Hunters
Mickey's Amateurs - Last Mickey short distributed by United Artists
Hawaiian Holiday - First Mickey short distributed by RKO Pictures
Modern Inventions
Clock Cleaners
Lonesome Ghosts – First appearance of the Ajax name brand

1938
Boat Builders 
Mickey's Trailer 
The Whalers
Mickey's Parrot 
Brave Little Tailor
The Fox Hunt (cameo) – In a Donald & Goofy cartoon.

1939
Society Dog Show –  Last appearance of Mickey with his oval shaped eyes.
Mickey's Surprise Party – First appearance of Mickey and Minnie in their current designs. A commercial short made for the National Biscuit Company and shown at the 1939 New York World's Fair.
The Pointer
The Standard Parade –  A commercial short made for the Standard Oil Company.

1940s

1940
Tugboat Mickey 
Pluto's Dream House 
Mr. Mouse Takes a Trip
The Sorcerer's Apprentice (1940, segment of Fantasia)

1941
The Little Whirlwind
A Gentleman's Gentleman
Canine Caddy
The Nifty Nineties – First cartoon where Minnie wears a shirt.
Orphans' Benefit – Remake of the 1934 version, with updated character models, and in color.
Lend a Paw

1942
Mickey's Birthday Party
Symphony Hour
All Together – Made for the National Film Board of Canada to promote the sale of Canadian War Bonds.
Out of the Frying Pan Into the Firing Line (cameo) – While Mickey has no active role, a picture of him as a soldier appears on a wall in Minnie's house.

1943-1949
Pluto and the Armadillo (1943) – Last appearance of Mickey in his traditional red shorts until 1995.
Squatter's Rights (1946)
Mickey and the Beanstalk (1947, a segment of Fun and Fancy Free) – First appearance of Willie the Giant. Jimmy MacDonald's first role as Mickey (filling in for parts not voiced by Walt Disney).
Mickey's Delayed Date (1947) – Walt Disney's last role as Mickey.
Mickey Down Under (1948)
Pluto's Purchase (1948) – In a Pluto cartoon.
Mickey and the Seal (1948)
Pueblo Pluto (1949) – In a Pluto cartoon.

1950s
 Crazy Over Daisy (1950, cameo) – Mickey is seen briefly driving a car with Minnie.
Plutopia (1951) – In a Pluto cartoon.
R'coon Dawg (1951)
Pluto's Party (1952) – Eyebrows are added on Mickey.
 How to Be a Detective (1952, cameo) – Mickey's face is on the cover of the comic book Goofy is reading.
Pluto's Christmas Tree (1952)
The Simple Things (1953) – Last regular Mickey cartoon.
Walt Disney anthology television series (1954–2008)
The Mickey Mouse Club (1955–1959) – Walt Disney's first role as Mickey since 1947.

1960s
 The Mickey Mouse Anniversary Show (1968) – Jimmy MacDonald's last role as Mickey.
 Mickey Mouse in Vietnam (1969)

1970s
The Walt Disney Story (1973)
The New Mickey Mouse Club (1977–1979) – Wayne Allwine's first role as Mickey.
The 50th Annual Academy Awards (1978)
 The Mickey Mouse Jubilee Show (1978)

1980s
Once Upon a Mouse (1981) – A documentary featurette celebrating Walt Disney and Mickey Mouse.
The Treasure Planet (1982, cameo) - not made by Disney.
Mickey's Christmas Carol (1983) – First screen appearance of Mickey since 1953, Mickey's eyebrows are gone and his drawing style went back to the 1940s style.
Disneyland's 30th Anniversary Celebration (1985) – Live-action.
DTV Valentine (1986)
Walt Disney World's 15th Anniversary Celebration (1986) – Live-action.
DTV Doggone Valentine (1987)
Down and Out With Donald Duck (1987)
Funny, You Don't Look 200: A Constitutional Vaudeville (1987)
DTV Monster Hits (1987)
Star Tours (1987, cameo)
The 60 Annual Academy Awards (1988)
Totally Minnie (1988, cameo)
Who Framed Roger Rabbit (1988, cameo)
Mickey's 60th Birthday (1988) – TV special celebrating Mickey's 60th anniversary.
Oliver & Company (1988, cameo) – Mickey is seen on Fagin's watch.
 Here's to You, Mickey Mouse (1988) – TV special
The Little Mermaid (1989, cameo)
Tummy Trouble (1989, cameo) – Mickey appears as a mouse skull anatomical wall chart.

1990s
The Muppets at Walt Disney World (1990, cameo)
Here Come the Muppets (1990, Walt Disney World Attraction)
Disney Sing-Along Songs: Disneyland Fun (1990)
The Rescuers Down Under (1990, cameo) – Mickey is seen on Percival C. McLeach's watch.
The Prince and the Pauper (1990)
Michael & Mickey (1991, Walt Disney World Attraction)
Jim Henson's Muppet*Vision 3D (1991, Walt Disney World Attraction, cameo)
 The Best of Disney: 50 Years of Magic (1991)
Disney's Great American Celebration (1991)
 A Day at Disneyland (1991–1994)
Mickey's Audition (1992, Walt Disney World Attraction)
Walt Disney World Happy Easter Parade (1992)
Disney's All-Star 4th of July Spectacular: Celebrate the Spirit (1992)
Fantasmic! (1992, Disneyland Attraction)
Trail Mix-Up (1993, cameo) – Bee version of Mickey Mouse.
Disney Sing-Along Songs: Friend Like Me (1993)
Disney Sing-Along Songs: Let's Go to Disneyland Paris! (1993)
Bonkers (1993) – Mickey is featured as an unseen character in the episode "I Oughta Be In Toons"
Disney Sing-Along Songs: The Twelve Days of Christmas (1993)
Mickey's Fun Songs: Campout a Walt Disney World (1994)
Mickey's Fun Songs: Let's Go to the Circus! (1994)
A Goofy Movie (1995, cameo)
Mickey's Fun Songs: Beach Party at Walt Disney World (1995)
Runaway Brain (1995) – Remake of The Mad Doctor
Toy Story (1995, cameo) – Mickey Mouse was seen on the big watch.
Aladdin and the King of Thieves (1996, cameo) – Genie's transformation only.
Fantasmic! (1998, Walt Disney World Attraction)
The Spirit of Mickey (1998)
Mickey Mouse Works (1999–2000) – A compilation show with new made-for-TV animated shorts featuring Mickey and friends.
Mickey's Once Upon a Christmas (1999)
Toy Story 2 (1999, cameo) – A clip of Mickey and the Beanstalk is seen on TV.
Fantasia 2000 (1999) – Reuse of earlier Fantasia appearance, plus a new scene of Mickey telling Donald that he's on in 30 seconds.

2000s
House of Mouse (2001–2003) – A show showing short animated cartoons of Disney's favorite characters.
Mickey's Magical Christmas: Snowed in at the House of Mouse (2001) – House of Mouse video release.
Stone Ocean (2002, cameo) – Mickey's tail briefly appears in the chapter, "Bohemian Rhapsody, Part 1". The author, Hirohiko Araki originally wanted to have him fully appear but the idea was rejected by his editing department. He was omitted from the 2021 anime adaptation.
Mickey's House of Villains (2002) – House of Mouse video release.
 The Search for Mickey Mouse (2002) – Cancelled feature-length film made as a celebration of Mickey Mouse's 75th anniversary.
Mickey's PhilharMagic (2003, Walt Disney World Attraction)
The Lion King 1½ (2004, cameo) – Mickey Mouse was hidden, and after that, he became his shadow appearance. (He was found in the ending scene.)
Mickey, Donald, Goofy: The Three Musketeers (2004)
Mickey's Twice Upon a Christmas (2004) – First Mickey film was done in CGI animation.
Disney Learning Adventures: Mickey's Seeing the World - Mickey's Around the World in 80 Days (2005)
Chicken Little (2005, cameo) – Mickey Mouse has three eyes (instead of two) and was seen on the watch.
Mickey Mouse Clubhouse (2006–2016) – TV series made for preschoolers done in CGI animation.
Mickey Saves Santa and Other Mouseketales (2006)
How to Hook Up Your Home Theater (2007, cameo) – Mickey is seen on Goofy's watch.
Mickey's Great Clubhouse Hunt (2007)
Mickey's Storybook Surprises (2008)
Playhouse Disney.com (2009)
Mickey's Big Splash (2009)
Have a Laugh! (2009–2012) – Mickey Mouse was re-dubbed by Bret Iwan in re-dubbed classic cartoons; he made his footage appearances in Re-Micks. (Mickey Mouse makes cameos in two BLAM! shorts, Clock Cleaning and Beach.)
Mickey's Adventures in Wonderland (2009)
South Park (2009) – Mickey Mouse's first parody in the show was on the episode “The Ring”, when he is portrayed as the villainous boss of the Jonas Brothers and forces them and their female fans to wear purity rings. He later had important roles in episodes such as “Band in China”.

2010s
Minnie's Bow-Tique (2010)
Road Rally (2010)
Numbers Round-Up (2010)
Minnie's Masquerade (2011)
Mickey's Mousekersize (2011)
Where's Pluto (2011)
Mickey's World Record Animals (2011)
Fantasmic! (2011, Tokyo DisneySEA Attraction)
Electric Holiday (2012) – This short film, distributed via the web, stars Minnie as the featured character, but Mickey also makes an appearance.
Celebrate the Magic (2012–2016, cameo, Walt Disney World Attraction)
Get a Horse! (2013) – First Mickey Mouse cartoon short in 18 years.
Mickey Mouse (2013–2019)
Minnie's the Wizard of Dizz (2013)
Minnie's Bow-Toons (2013)
Frozen (2013, cameo) – A small Mickey toy is partially seen on a shelf.
 Saving Mr. Banks (2013) - As symbolic metafictional character.
 Minnie-rella (2014)
 Minnie's Winter Bow Show (2014)
World of Color – Celebrate! The Wonderful World of Walt Disney (2015–2016, Disney California Adventure Attraction) – Mickey hosting with Neil Patrick Harris.
Zootopia (2016, cameo) – Mickey plush mascot is seen on a stroller.
Ignite the Dream, A Nighttime Spectacular of Magic and Light (2016, Shanghai Disneyland Attraction)
Mickey Mouse Mixed-Up Adventures (2017–2021)
 Disney Illuminations (2017, Disneyland Paris Attraction)
Disney Gifts of Christmas (2017, Tokyo Disneyland Attraction)
Ralph Breaks the Internet (2018, cameo) - Mickey is seen standing on top of a giant sorcerer's hat.
Celebrate! Tokyo Disneyland (2018, Tokyo Disneyland Attraction)
Mickey's 90th Spectacular (2018) – TV special celebrating Mickey's 90th anniversary.
Mickey Go Local (2019)

2020s
Mickey & Minnie's Runaway Railway (2020) – Walt Disney World Hollywood Studios attraction
The Wonderful World of Mickey Mouse (2020–present)
Mickey Mouse Funhouse (2021–present)
Mickey's Tale of Two Witches (2021) – Halloween special
Mickey and Minnie Wish Upon a Christmas (2021) – Christmas special
Me & Mickey (2022-present)
Welcome to the Club (2022, cameo)
Mickey: The Story of a Mouse (2022) – Documentary
Mickey Saves Christmas (2022) – Christmas special
The Simpsons Meet the Bocellis in "Feliz Navidad" (2022, cameo)

Video games
Mickey Mouse (Game & Watch) (1981) – Mickey's first video game appearance.
Mickey & Donald (Game & Watch) (1982)
Sorcerer's Apprentice (1983)
Mickey Mouse (Game & Watch) (1984)
Mickey's Space Adventure (1986)
Mickey Mousecapade (1987)
Mickey Mouse: The Computer Game (1988)
Mickey Mouse Mahou No Yakata (1989)
Mickey Mouse (1989, Japan only)
Mickey Mouse Wa Shouboushi (1990)
Castle of Illusion Starring Mickey Mouse (1990)
Mickey's 123: The Big Surprise Party (1990)
Mickey's ABC's: A Day at The Fair (1990)
Mickey Mouse II (1991)
Mickey's Dangerous Chase (1991)
Fantasia (video game) (1991)
The Magical Quest Starring Mickey Mouse (1992)
Mickey Mouse III: Yume Fuusen (1992, Japan only)
World of Illusion Starring Mickey Mouse and Donald Duck (1992)
Mickey's Safari in Letterland (1993)
Land of Illusion Starring Mickey Mouse (1993)
Mickey Mouse IV: Mahō no Labyrinth (1993, Japan only)
Mickey's Memory Challenge (1993)
Mickey's Adventures in Numberland (1994)
Storybook Weaver/Storybook Weaver Deluxe (1994/2004)
The Great Circus Mystery Starring Mickey & Minnie (1994)
Mickey Mania (1994)
Mickey no Tokyo Disneyland Daibōken (1994)
Legend of Illusion Starring Mickey Mouse (1995)
Disney's Magical Quest 3 Starring Mickey & Donald (1995, Japan only/2003)
Magical Tetris Challenge (1998)
Mickey's Magic Wands! (1998)
Mickey's Racing Adventure (1999)
My Disney Kitchen (2000)
Disney Learning: Mickey Mouse (2000)
Mickey's Speedway USA (2000)
Mickey Saves the Day (2000)
Kingdom Hearts (2002)
Disney Golf (2002)
Disney's Magical Mirror Starring Mickey Mouse (2002)
Disney's Hide and Sneak (2003)
Kingdom Hearts: Chain of Memories (2004)
Kingdom Hearts II (2005)
Disney Magicboard Online (2007)
Disney TH!NK Fast (2008)
Kingdom Hearts Coded (2008)
Kingdom Hearts 358/2 Days (2009)
Kingdom Hearts Birth by Sleep (2010)
Epic Mickey (2010)
Kinect Disneyland Adventures (2011)
Kingdom Hearts 3D: Dream Drop Distance (2012)
Epic Mickey 2: The Power of Two (2012)
Epic Mickey: Power of Illusion (2012)
Kingdom Hearts HD 1.5 Remix (2013)
Kingdom Hearts χ (2013)
Disney Magical World (2013)
Disney Infinity (2013)
Castle of Illusion Starring Mickey Mouse (2013) – Remake of Castle of Illusion Starring Mickey Mouse.
Disney Infinity 2.0 (2014)
Kingdom Hearts HD 2.5 Remix (2014)
Fantasia: Music Evolved (2014)
Disney Infinity 3.0 (2015)
Disney Magical World 2 (2015)
Disney Magic Kingdoms (2016)
Disney Art Academy (2016)
Kingdom Hearts HD 2.8 Final Chapter Prologue (2016)
Kingdom Hearts III (2019)
Kingdom Hearts: Melody of Memory (2020)
Super Smash Bros. Ultimate (2021) — A silhouette of Mickey's head appears as a keychain on Sora's Keyblade
Disney Mirrorverse (2022)
Disney Speedstorm (2022)
Disney Dreamlight Valley (2023)
Disney Illusion Island (2023)

See also
 Mickey Mouse (film series)

References

Mickey Mouse
Mickey Mouse